The governor of the Netherlands Antilles was the representative of the Kingdom of the Netherlands in the Netherlands Antilles and the head of the government of the Netherlands Antilles.

Duties
With the introduction of the Charter for the Kingdom of the Netherlands in 1954, the powers, obligations and responsibilities of the governor as an organ of the Kingdom of the Netherlands were regulated in the Regulations for the Governor; Article 15, paragraph 1 reads:

The governor is therefore authorized, within the limits of these regulations and the instruction of the Crown, to act on behalf of the government of the Kingdom of the Netherlands.

According to the Constitution, the governor, as a representative of the monarch, was the head of the government of the Netherlands Antilles. As the head of the government, the governor was immune. The governor exercised executive power under the responsibility of the ministers, who are responsible to the Parliament of the Netherlands Antilles.

Dissolution
On 10 October 2010 the Netherlands Antilles was dissolved. With the dissolution of the Antilles, Curaçao and Sint Maarten became constituent countries within the Kingdom of the Netherlands, while Bonaire, Sint Eustatius and Saba became special municipalities of the Netherlands. each constituent country within the kingdom has its own governor. Bonaire, Sint Eustatius and Saba are represented by a gezaghebber.

List of governors of Curaçao and Dependencies (1845–1954)
Before the introduction of the Charter for the Kingdom of the Netherlands in 1954, the Dutch Antilles was called Curaçao and Dependencies.

List of governors of the Netherlands Antilles (1954–2010)
Following the introduction of the charter, the governor position was officiated in the Constitution of the Netherlands Antilles

Gubernatorial standards

See also
 Prime Minister of the Netherlands Antilles
 Constitution of the Netherlands Antilles

References

External links
Homepage of the Governor of the Netherlands Antilles

Government of the Netherlands Antilles
Governors of the Netherlands Antilles